The 2021–22 Boston College Eagles men's basketball team represented Boston College during the 2021–22 NCAA Division I men's basketball season. The Eagles, were led by first-year head coach Earl Grant, played their home games at the Conte Forum as members of the Atlantic Coast Conference.

The Eagles finished 13–20 overall and 6–14 in ACC play to finish in a three way tie for eleventh place.  As the thirteenth seed in the ACC tournament, they defeated twelfth seed Pittsburgh in the first round and fifth seed Wake Forest in the second round before losing to fourth seed Miami in the quarterfinals.  They were not invited to the NCAA tournament or the NIT.

Previous season
The Eagles finished the 2020–21 season 4–16, 2–11 in ACC play to finish in last place. They lost to Duke in the first round of the ACC tournament.

Head coach Jim Christian was fired on February 15, 2021, after starting the season 3–13. Assistant Coach Scott Spinelli served as the interim head coach to finish the season.  On March 15, the school named College of Charleston head coach Earl Grant the new coach for the Eagles.

Offseason

Departures

Incoming transfers

2021 recruiting class

Roster

Schedule and results

Source:

|-
!colspan=9 style=| Regular season

|-
!colspan=12 style=|ACC tournament

Rankings

*AP does not release post-NCAA tournament rankings and the Coaches poll did not release a Week 1 poll.

References

Boston College Eagles men's basketball seasons
Boston College
Boston College Eagles men's basketball
Boston College Eagles men's basketball
Boston College Eagles men's basketball
Boston College Eagles men's basketball